Udit Patel (born 31 August 1984) is an Indian first-class cricketer who plays for Karnataka. He is the son of former India cricketer Brijesh Patel.

References

External links
 

1984 births
Living people
Indian cricketers
Karnataka cricketers
Place of birth missing (living people)